Kealy is a suburb of the Western Australian city of Busselton. At the 2021 census, it had a population of 1,119.
 
The Australian Broadcasting Corporation has a radio transmitter there.  The area is being developed for residential uses relating to the nearby suburb of Vasse.

References

Suburbs of Busselton